Synchronous conferencing is the formal term used in computing, in particular in computer-mediated communication, collaboration and learning, to describe technologies informally known as online chat. It is sometimes extended to include audio/video conferencing or instant messaging systems that provide a text-based multi-user chat function. The word synchronous is used to qualify the conferencing as real-time, as distinct from a system such as e-mail, where messages are left and answered later.

Synchronous conferencing protocols include:

 IRC (Internet Relay Chat)
 PSYC (Protocol for Synchronous Conferencing)
 SILC (Secure Internet Live Conferencing protocol)
 XMPP (Extensible Messaging and Presence Protocol)
 SIMPLE (instant messaging protocol) (Session Initiation Protocol for Instant Messaging and Presence Leveraging Extensions)

Types 
According to the type of media used, synchronous conferencing can be divided into
 audio conferencing: only audio is used 
 video conferencing: Both audio (voice) and video and picture are used.

According to the number of access point used, synchronous conferencing can be divided into 
 point-to-point: Only two computers are connected end to end.
 multi-point: Two or more than two computers are connected together.

Synchronous vs asynchronous conferencing 
Both synchronous and asynchronous conferencing are online conferencing where the participants can interact while being physically located at different places in the world. Asynchronous conferencing allows the students to access the learning material at their convenience while synchronous conferencing requires that all participants including the instructor and the students be online at the time of conference.

While synchronous conferencing enables real time interaction of the participants, asynchronous conferencing allows participants to post messages and others can respond to it at any convenient time. Sometimes a combination of both synchronous and asynchronous conferencing is used. Both the methods give a permanent record of the conference.

Methods 
Some of the methods used in synchronous conferencing are:
 Chat (text only): Multiple participants can be logged into the conference and can interactively share resources and ideas. There is also option to save the chat and archive it for later review. 
 Voice (telephone or voice-over IP): This is a conference call between the instructor and the participating students where they can speak through built-in microphone or a headset. 
 Video conferencing: This may or may not require the participants to have their webcams running. Usually, a video conference involves a live feed from a classroom or elsewhere or a content.
 Web conferencing: This includes Webinar (Web-based seminar) as well. Unlike in video conferencing, participants of a web conferencing can access a wider variety of media elements. Web conferences are comparatively more interactive and usually incorporate chat sessions as well.
 Internet radio/podcasts: The instructors makes the audio file available in the Internet which is archived and the students subscribed to the podcast can download it.
 Virtual worlds: In this set up, students can meet in virtual world and speak with each other through headsets and VoIP. 	This can make the learning more productive and engaging when the students are able to navigate the worlds and operate in their avatar.

Critical factors for effective implementation 

There are four critical factors identified for implementing synchronous conferencing for effective instruction to the students
 Video and audio quality which depends on technical factors like higher bandwidth and processing capabilities of the system.
 Training time which depends on the familiarity and proficiency of the instructors and the students with the technology.
 Teaching strategies which depends on the adaptability of the instructors with the new methods, preparing appropriate and effective training materials and motivating students.
 Direct meeting of the instructor and the students.

Synchronous conferencing in higher education 
Synchronous conferencing in education helps in the delivery of content through digital media. Since this is a real-time teaching, it also brings the benefits of face-to-face teaching in distance learning. Many higher education institutions offer well-designed quality e-learning opportunities. 
Some of the advantages of synchronous conferencing in education are:
 Helps the students to connect with not only their own teachers and peers but also with recognized experts in the field regardless of the geographical distance and different time zones. 
 Provides opportunities to both the teachers and the students to expand their knowledge outside the classrooms. 
 Helps students who are home-bound or limited mobility to connect with their classrooms and participate in learning.
 Helps the faculties to conduct classes when they are not able to come to classes due to an emergency.
 Supports real-time collaboration, interaction and immediate feedback
 Encourage students to learn together and in turn develop cultural understanding
 Personalized learning experience for the students
 Real-time discussion opportunities for students promoting student engagement
 Active interaction can lead to an associated community of like-minded students
 Saves travel expenses and time

Implementation of educational technology 
The tools for implementing synchronous conferencing depends on the type of educational problem addressed. This is in turn decides the method of synchronous conferencing to be used and the tool to be used in the learning context. The tool selected addresses the problem of improving the learning outcomes which cannot be solved with an asynchronous environment. There are many tools and platforms available for synchronous conferencing.
 Smartphone applications
 Web conferencing tools
 Video conferencing tools
 Video and hangout platforms
 Shared whiteboards
The selection of tools and platforms also depend on the group size which depends on the activity for the course design.

Effective teaching strategies 
To make synchronous conferencing effective and engaging, appropriate teaching strategies are important and plays a very important role in making the learning successful. Some of these are 
 Emphasizing and adhering to time allotted

Limitations 
Some limitations for synchronous conferencing in learning are:
 Disjointed discussions, not connected in time
 Lack of effective moderation and/or clear guidelines for learners
 Difficulty in collaborating online projects
 Lack of proper communication with the instructor and students.
 Technical issues may arise if not analysed and planned in advance
 Lack of familiarity with the tools
 Limited time to complete the learning activity and to incorporate interactions of the learners

See also 
 Collaborative software (Groupware)
 MUDs (Multi-User Dungeons)
 Asynchronous conferencing

References

Online chat
Teleconferencing
Educational technology
Groupware